Endrina Elezaj (born 2 January 1997) is a Kosovan-born Albanian footballer who plays as a defender and has appeared for the Albania women's national team.

Career
Elezaj has been capped for the Albania national team, appearing for the team during the 2019 FIFA Women's World Cup qualifying cycle.

See also
List of Albania women's international footballers

References

External links
 
 
 

1997 births
Living people
Albanian women's footballers
Women's association football defenders
Albania women's international footballers
People from Klina
Kosovan women's footballers
KFF Mitrovica players
KFF Hajvalia players
Kosovan people of Albanian descent
Sportspeople of Albanian descent